The Boston College Eagles women's ice hockey team represent Boston College in the NCAA and participate in Hockey East. The Eagles are coached by former Olympic gold medallist Katie King-Crowley and play their home games at Conte Forum. They have won the Hockey East championship three times, and made seven trips to the Frozen Four of the NCAA tournament.

History
The Boston Eagles women's ice hockey program was launched in 1994, under head coach Tom O'Malley, who oversaw the development of the program for five years.  In 1999, Tom Babson took the helm and coached for four seasons. In the early years, the team competed in the Eastern Collegiate Athletic Conference (ECAC) but struggled to build a competitive program.

In 2002, they joined the newly formed Hockey East Conference for women's hockey. Tom Mutch was hired as the head coach in 2003, and the program began to see greater success. The Eagles won their first Beanpot championship in 2006, and finished second in the conference that year. The following year, the team had its best season to-date, finishing 24-20-2, and qualifying for the NCAA championship tournament for the first time. The Eagles lost in the semi-finals to Minnesota-Duluth in double overtime.

Shortly after, on April 24, 2007, Tom Mutch resigned as head coach of the women's ice hockey program. The resignation came in the wake of an inappropriate relationship with Kelli Stack, a freshman who was the Hockey East Player and Rookie of the Year. The Boston Herald had printed an article earlier that day that detailed the alleged explicit text messaging that occurred between the married Tom Mutch and Stack. Mutch was forced to resign. Though a sexual relationship was never proven, the messages were said to be "filthy" by news reports at the time.

Katie King-Crowley, the Eagles assistant coach, was hired as head coach in May 2007. Courtney Kennedy became Associate Head Coach.

Under King-Crowley's leadership, the program became one of the most competitive in women's ice hockey. Originally from Salem, Massachusetts, she had a strong college career as a forward with Brown University. She competed in three Olympics with the U.S. National team, winning a gold medal in 1998, a silver in 2002, and a bronze in 2006. In thirteen seasons with King-Crowley as head coach, the Eagles have won three Hockey East tournament championships, lead the regular conference season four times, played in six NCAA Frozen Four tournaments, and competed in one NCAA championship final.

The 2010-2011 season was one of the first major successes in the program; the team would go on to win their first Hockey East title. In October, Taylor Wasylk was recognized as Hockey East Rookie of the Week for three consecutive weeks,  the first time in Boston College Eagles women's ice hockey history that a player has won a league award for three consecutive weeks. Kelli Stack was the October 2010 Hockey East Player of the Month.  She finished October 2010 with fifteen points (nine goals, six assists) in eight games for Boston College. Stack started every game at center and has accumulated points in every game. She finished the month leading the Eagles in points, goals, power play goals, and shorthanded goals. On October 31, she was involved in all three goals against Connecticut (one goal, two assists). She was part of all three goals scored at Vermont on October 15 (two goals, one assist). Against the Syracuse Orange (on October 9), Stack scored a hat trick. On February 8, 2011, with two points in the game against Boston University in the first round of the 2011 Beanpot Tournament, Kelli Stack accumulated 199 points in her career and broke BC's all-time career points record, becoming the new program leader. On March 6, 2011, the Eagles beat the Northeastern Huskies by a 3-1 tally to claim their first Hockey East Tournament championship.

In 2014-2015, the Eagles received their first #1 ranking, after starting the season undefeated. They posted a 27-0-1 record before losing a game, and went undefeated in conference play. The Eagles returned to the NCAA Frozen Four, losing in the semi-final. Alex Carpenter became the first Boston College player to win the Patty Kazmaier Award. She accumulated 81 points during the season, scoring 37 goals and registering 44 assists. King-Crowley won the national Coach of the Year award.

In 2016-2017, the Eagles coaching staff was the only all-female staff in college ice hockey. King-Crowley and Kennedy were joined by assistants Gilian Apps and Alison Quandt.

In 2017-2018, BC won their third straight Beanpot in the annual tournament held in February. They won a fifth straight Hockey East title, and established their best record at 30-5-3.

Daryl Watts would follow Carpenter as the second Patty Kazmaier Award winner in Eagles history, capturing the award in 2018. Watts’ end-to-end shorthanded goal against the University of New Hampshire was also recognized among the BC Eagles Athletics’ Top 10 Plays of the 2017-18 season, placing second. Winning both the Hockey East Player and Rookie of the Year Awards, she became only the second player in conference history to do so, tying a mark set by former Boston College player Kelli Stack in 2006.  In 2019, fans were shocked by the sudden departure of Watts, who transferred to the Wisconsin Badgers mid-season.

Year by year

Current roster
As of September 11, 2022.

Awards and honors
Hannah Bilka, 2020 Women's Hockey Commissioners Association National Rookie of the Year, and 2020 Hockey East Rookie of the Year
Molly Barrow, 2019 Distinguished Fellow, Hockey East All Academic team (awarded for making the All Academic Team for all four years)
Daryl Watts, 2018 Women's Hockey Commissioners Association National Rookie of the Year
 Katie King, 2015 AHCA Women's Ice Hockey Division I Coach of the Year
 Blake Bolden, 2011 Hockey East All-Tournament team
 Kiera Kingston, Bauer/Hockey East Goaltender of the Month, February 2010
 Ashley Motherwell, 2010 WHEA All-Rookie Team
Molly Schaus, 2011 Bertagna Goaltending Award
Kelli Stack, 2011 Hockey East All-Tournament team
Kelli Stack, 2011 Hockey East Tournament Most Valuable Player
 Allie Thunstrom, 2010 WHEA Second-Team All-Star
 Allie Thunstrom, Frozen Four Skills Competition participant

Beanpot
Mary Restuccia, 2011 Beanpot MVP

Patty Kazmaier Award
Alexandra Carpenter, 2015 Patty Kazmaier Award recipient
Daryl Watts, 2018 recipient

All-Americans
 Molly Schaus, 2011 First Team All-America selection
 Kelli Stack, 2011 Second Team All-America selection
 Alex Carpenter, 2015 First-Team All-America selection
 Megan Keller, 2016-17 AHCA-CCM Women's University Division I All-American 
 Daryl Watts, 2018 First-Team All-America selection
 Caitrin Lonergan, 2018 Second-Team All-America selection
 Toni Ann Miano, 2018 Second-Team All-America selection
Cayla Barnes, 2020-21 Second Team CCM/AHCA All-American

Hockey East
Kelli Stack, 2010-11 Cammi Granato Award (Hockey East Player of the Year)

Rookie of the Year
 Hannah Bilka, 2019 Hockey East Rookie of the Year

Defensive Player of the Month
Corinne Boyles, Hockey East Goaltender of the Month (Month of December 2011)

Katie Burt, Hockey East Defensive Player of the Month (December 2014) 
Katie Burt, Hockey East Defensive Player of the Month (January 2015)

Player of the Month
Kelli Stack, Hockey East Pure Hockey Player of the Month (October 2010) 
Alex Carpenter, Hockey East Player of the Month (November 2014) 
Haley Skarupa, Hockey East Player of the Month (December 2014)

Rookie of the Month
Katie Burt, Hockey East Rookie of the Month (December 2014) 
Alexandra Carpenter, Hockey East Rookie of the Month (Month of December 2011)
Kenzie Kent, Hockey East Rookie of the Month (November 2014)

All-Rookie Team
Gaby Roy, 2021 Hockey East All-Rookie Team

All-Stars
Alexandra Carpenter, 2014-15 Hockey East First Team All-Star
Alex Carpenter, 2015-2016 Hockey East First Team All-Star
Megan Keller, 2014-15 Hockey East First Team All-Star
Megan Keller, 2015-2016 Hockey East First Team All-Star
Emily Pfalzer, 2014-15 Hockey East First Team All-Star
Lexi Bender, 2015-16 Hockey East First Team All-Star
Haley Skarupa, 2015-16 Hockey East First Team All-Star

Weekly Awards
 Taylor Wasylk, Hockey East Rookie of the Week (Week of October 11, 2010)
 Taylor Wasylk, Hockey East Rookie of the Week (Week of October 18, 2010)
 Taylor Wasylk, Hockey East Rookie of the Week (Week of October 25, 2010)

Hockey Commissioners Association
 Gaby Roy, Hockey Commissioners Association Women’s Player of the Month (November 2020)

New England hockey awards
 Kelli Stack, 2010-11 New England Women's Player of the Year
 Mary Restuccia, 2010-11 New England Women's Division I All-Stars
 Molly Schaus, 2010-11 New England Women's Division I All-Stars
 Kelli Stack, 2010-11 New England Women's Division I All-Stars
Daryl Watts, 2017-18 First Team Hockey East

BC honors
Daryl Watts, 2018 Boston College Athletics Female Rookie of the Year Award

Eagles in professional hockey
In Progress

References

External links
Official website

 
Ice hockey teams in Massachusetts